Novosibirsk Tools Plant is a plant in Oktyabrsky City District of Novosibirsk, Russia. It produces hand tools. The plant was founded in 1941.

History
The plant was created on the basis of partially evacuated Sestroretsky Tool Plant in 1941.

Products
The plant produces electrical construction and metalworking hand tools (lineman's pliers, screwdrivers, wrenches etc.).

Location
Novosibirsk Tools Plant is located in Oktyabrsky City District on Bolshevistskaya Street 100.

References

Manufacturing companies based in Novosibirsk
Manufacturing companies established in 1941
Manufacturing companies of the Soviet Union
Oktyabrsky District, Novosibirsk
Tool manufacturing companies of Russia
1941 establishments in the Soviet Union